Albert Mahieu (1860–1926) was a French politician. He served as a member of the Chamber of Deputies from 1906 to 1919, representing Manche.

References

1860 births
1926 deaths
People from Cherbourg-Octeville
Politicians from Normandy
Republican-Socialist Party politicians
Members of the 9th Chamber of Deputies of the French Third Republic
Members of the 10th Chamber of Deputies of the French Third Republic
Members of the 11th Chamber of Deputies of the French Third Republic